Willenhall may refer to: 

 Willenhall, Walsall, West Midlands
Willenhall F.C., former football club
Willenhall Town F.C., current football club
 Willenhall, Coventry